Léone Boudreau-Nelson, C.M, (December 9, 1915 – April 26, 2004) was an American-born Canadian phonetician. She founded the Société d'art oratoire at the Université de Moncton, where she was professeur émérite.

Biography
Léone Boudreau-Nelson was born in Somerville, Massachusetts, December 9, 1915 to Acadian parents. She was a professor of French phonetics at the Université de Moncton, where she founded the Société d'art oratoire.

Death and legacy
Léone Boudreau-Nelson died on April 26, 2004. Her documents are held by the Centre d'études acadiennes Anselme-Chiasson at Université de Moncton.

Awards and honours
 1990, Member, Order of Canada 
 2002, Queen Elizabeth II Golden Jubilee Medal

References

1915 births
2004 deaths
Members of the Order of Canada
People from Somerville, Massachusetts
Phoneticians
Acadian people
Academic staff of the Université de Moncton